The Massacre of Glencoe is a 1971 British historical drama film directed by Austin Campbell and starring James Robertson Justice, Andrew Crawford and William Dysart. The film depicts the 1692 Massacre of Glencoe in Scotland.

Cast
 James Robertson Justice - Macian
 Andrew Crawford - Glenlyon
 William Dysart - Breadalbane
 David Orr - Sir John
 Sandie Nielson Argyll
 Arthur Boland - Lochiel
 John Young - Colonel Hill
 Charles Fawcett - John Macdonald
 George Morgan - Alasdair Macdonald
 Ian Ireland - Lieutenant Lindsay

References

External links

1971 films
1970s historical drama films
British historical drama films
Films set in Scotland
Films shot in Scotland
1971 drama films
1970s English-language films
1970s British films